Lipki is the name of several inhabited localities in Russia.

Modern localities
Urban localities
Lipki, Kireyevsky District, Tula Oblast, a town in Kireyevsky District of Tula Oblast

Rural localities
Lipki, Mglinsky District, Bryansk Oblast, a settlement in Oskolkovsky Rural Administrative Okrug of Mglinsky District in Bryansk Oblast; 
Lipki, Navlinsky District, Bryansk Oblast, a village under the administrative jurisdiction of Navlintsky Settlement Administrative Okrug in Navlinsky District of Bryansk Oblast; 
Lipki, Pochepsky District, Bryansk Oblast, a settlement in Dmitrovsky Rural Administrative Okrug of Pochepsky District in Bryansk Oblast; 
Lipki, Unechsky District, Bryansk Oblast, a village in Pavlovsky Rural Administrative Okrug of Unechsky District in Bryansk Oblast; 
Lipki, Kaliningrad Oblast, a settlement in Novostroyevsky Rural Okrug of Ozyorsky District in Kaliningrad Oblast
Lipki, Leningrad Oblast, a village under the administrative jurisdiction of Lyubanskoye Settlement Municipal Formation in Tosnensky District of Leningrad Oblast
Lipki, Republic of Mordovia, a settlement in Lipkinsky Selsoviet of Romodanovsky District in the Republic of Mordovia
Lipki, Moscow Oblast, a village in Yershovskoye Rural Settlement of Odintsovsky District in Moscow Oblast
Lipki, Oryol Oblast, a village in Bolshekulikovsky Selsoviet of Orlovsky District in Oryol Oblast
Lipki, Pskov Oblast, a village in Pskovsky District of Pskov Oblast
Lipki, Sasovsky District, Ryazan Oblast, a settlement in Saltykovsky Rural Okrug of Sasovsky District in Ryazan Oblast
Lipki, Zakharovsky District, Ryazan Oblast, a selo in Dobro-Pchelsky Rural Okrug of Zakharovsky District in Ryazan Oblast
Lipki, Dukhovshchinsky District, Smolensk Oblast, a village in Dobrinskoye Rural Settlement of Dukhovshchinsky District in Smolensk Oblast
Lipki, Pochinkovsky District, Smolensk Oblast, a village in Dankovskoye Rural Settlement of Pochinkovsky District in Smolensk Oblast
Lipki, Sychyovsky District, Smolensk Oblast, a village in Bekhteyevskoye Rural Settlement of Sychyovsky District in Smolensk Oblast
Lipki, Berezovsky Rural Okrug, Kireyevsky District, Tula Oblast, a village in Berezovsky Rural Okrug of Kireyevsky District in Tula Oblast
Lipki, Leninsky District, Tula Oblast, a village in Oktyabrsky Rural Okrug of Leninsky District in Tula Oblast
Lipki, Odoyevsky District, Tula Oblast, a village in Stoyanovskaya Rural Administration of Odoyevsky District in Tula Oblast
Lipki, Tver Oblast, a village in Ponizovskoye Rural Settlement of Toropetsky District in Tver Oblast
Lipki, Ulyanovsk Oblast, a settlement under the administrative jurisdiction of the town of oblast significance of Novoulyanovsk in Ulyanovsk Oblast
Lipki, Vladimir Oblast, an area in Vyaznikovsky District of Vladimir Oblast
Lipki, Yaroslavl Oblast, a village in Nikolo-Kormsky Rural Okrug of Rybinsky District in Yaroslavl Oblast

Abolished localities
Lipki, Moscow, a rural locality (a settlement) in Yuzhnoye Butovo District of the federal city of Moscow; abolished in July 2012